Paddock Wood railway station is on the South Eastern Main Line and Medway Valley Line in south-east England, serving the town of Paddock Wood, Kent. The station also serves the villages of Matfield, Brenchley and Horsmonden, which have do not have stations of their own. It is  down the line from London Charing Cross. The station and all trains calling there are operated by Southeastern.

History

The South Eastern Railway opened a line from Redhill to Ashford and on to Dover during 1842. This bypassed the county town of Maidstone, and a station named Maidstone Road was opened in a rural location on 31 August 1842 to serve the town,  to the north. The village of Paddock Wood developed quickly around the station, which took the name Paddock Wood on 25 September 1844 when the branch line to Maidstone West was opened. Another branch line—the Hawkhurst Branch—to the village of Hawkhurst existed between 1892 and 1961.

In popular culture

Paddock Wood Railway station appears in the novel Dombey and Son by Charles Dickens where, in chapter 55, the villain, Mr Carker, accidentally falls under a train at the station and is killed.

Platforms

The station has Up and Down platforms (1 and 2 respectively) with a pair of fast lines between them.  On the Down side, a bay platform (platform 3) is used for the Medway Valley Line services to Maidstone and beyond.  A matching bay platform existed on the Up side when the Hawkhurst branch was in operation.  The main station building is on the Up platform; there are long canopies on both platforms.  Transfer between platforms is by footbridge.

Services
All services at Paddock Wood are operated by Southeastern using  EMUs.

The typical off-peak service in trains per hour is:
 2 tph to London Charing Cross
 1 tph to 
 1 tph to  via 
 2 tph to  via 

During the peak hours, there are additional services to and from London Cannon Street and the service to Dover Priory is extended to and from Ramsgate via .

On Sundays, the service to and from Strood is reduced to hourly.

Accidents

At 03:40 hrs on 5 May 1919, a goods train from Bricklayers Arms to Margate overran signals and ran into the back of another goods train just to the west of Paddock Wood station. The Margate train was hauled by C class No. 721. It had 50 goods vehicles including three brake vans. The other train was hauled by C class No. 61. The fireman of this train was killed in the accident. Although the main cause of the accident was the driver of the Margate train failing to obey signals, the signalman at Tonbridge East signal box was also censured for failure to give the driver adequate warning that although the train had been accepted by the signalman at Paddock Wood, the line was not fully clear at the junction. The signalman at Paddock Wood had accepted the train under Regulation No 5 - "Section clear but station or junction blocked".

On 16 March 1949, "Schools" Class locomotive 30932 Blundells was derailed at the station.

The wreckage from the accident piled up under the bridge carrying the B2160 Maidstone Road. The line was blocked for 12 hours.

Bus connections

Routes 6, 6A, 203, 205 and 296 are available from stops near the station.

References
Citations

Sources

External links
Tonbridge Line Commuters - Paddock Wood

Paddock Wood station on navigable 1940 OS map

Railway stations in Kent
DfT Category C2 stations
Railway stations in Great Britain opened in 1842
Railway stations served by Southeastern
Former South Eastern Railway (UK) stations
Paddock Wood